Osvaldo Bailo (12 September 1912 – 28 February 1997) was an Italian professional road cyclist.

Professional from 1934 to 1947, Bailo won several Italian semi-classics and wore the Maglia Rosa for two days during the 1940 Giro d'Italia.

Major results

1935
 2nd Genoa–Nice
1936
 8th Giro di Lombardia
1937
 1st Giro di Romagna
 2nd Genoa–Nice
 6th Milan–San Remo
1938
 2nd Giro del Veneto
 2nd Milano–Mantova
 3rd Giro di Lombardia
 8th Milan–San Remo
1939
 3rd Milan–San Remo
 3rd Milano–Mantova
 4th Giro di Lombardia
 7th Tre Valli Varesine
1940
 1st Giro dell'Emilia
 2nd Giro di Lombardia
 3rd Road race, National Road Championships
 3rd Gran Piemonte
 3rd Giro di Campania
 3rd Giro della Provincia Milano
 3rd Overall GP Leptis-Magna
 10th Milan–San Remo
1941
 3rd Gran Piemonte
 3rd Milano–Modena
 3rd Giro di Campania
 8th Giro dell'Emilia
1942
 1st Giro del Lazio
 2nd Milano–Torino
 3rd Giro del Veneto
 7th Giro di Lombardia
 10th Milan–San Remo
1943
 9th Giro di Toscana
 9th Milan–San Remo
1946
 1st Coppa Bernocchi
 1st Tour du Nord-Ouest
 6th Giro di Lombardia
 6th Zürich–Lausanne
 8th Milan–San Remo
1947
 5th Milan–San Remo

References

1912 births
1997 deaths
Italian male cyclists
People from Serravalle Scrivia
Cyclists from Piedmont
Sportspeople from the Province of Alessandria
20th-century Italian people